is a Japanese family name and may refer to:

 Michiko Horibe (堀部 美智子, born 1974), Japanese ski mountaineer and telemark skier
 Horibe Yasubei Taketsune (堀部 武庸 安兵衛, 1670–1703), Japanese warrior
Cole Horibe (Born 1985), Actor, Martial Artist and Dancer. Most commonly known for his participation in So You Think You Can Dance (American season 9)

Fictional characters
, a character in the manga series Assassination Classroom

Japanese-language surnames